Babu (transl. Sir) is a 1985 film starring Rajesh Khanna in the lead role, supported by Hema Malini, Mala Sinha, Rati Agnihotri and Deepak Parashar. Music is by Rajesh Roshan. It is a remake of a Tamil film of the same name from 1971 directed by A. C. Tirulokchandar and starring Sivaji Ganesan, which itself was a remake of the 1965 Malayalam film, Odayil Ninnu, a film adaptation of Malayalam writer P. Kesavadev's acclaimed novel of the same title. The movie was a silver jubilee on its release.

Plot
Babu is a young man who works as a rickshaw puller and he has fallen in love with Kammo. His only true friend is Shambu Nath. One day he helps Shankerlal and his family and in return, Shankerlal invites him to his house. Instantly the whole family including Shankerlal's wife and Pinky both begin to shower love on Babu. Babu having led a tough childhood feels very ecstatic and feels grateful to Shankerlal on having provided him food, clothes and more importantly respect given to him. Meanwhile, a goon in the village rapes Kammo and Babu kills him and thereby lands in jail. After his release he finds Pinky begging in the streets and then he gets shocked as to how a rich girl has been forced to beg. realizes that now Pinky's mother is a widow. His sole aim now becomes to help this widow and her child. He gives up his personal life, drives a hand-drawn rickshaw, saves some money, so that he can buy provisions for them, as well as send the child, Pinky, to a decent school. Pinky then grows up and later starts disliking Babu. The rest of the story is how Pinky realizes her folly later on, how Pinky's mother feels indebted to Babu for having helped them in return for one night's shower of affection on Babu by Shankerlal.

Cast
Rajesh Khanna as Babu
Hema Malini as Kammo
Rati Agnihotri as Pinky
Deepak Parashar as Prem 
Mala Sinha as Widow
Madan Puri as Shambhunath
Navin Nischol as Shankarlal
Roopesh Kumar as Jaggu Dada
Mukri as Police Constable

Music
"Aise Rang De Piya" - Kishore Kumar, Lata Mangeshkar
"Main Kuwari Albeli" - Kishore Kumar, Asha Bhosle
"Yeh Mera Jeevan Tere Liye Hai" (duet) - Kishore Kumar, Alka Yagnik
"Ae Hawa" - Lata Mangeshkar
"Yeh Mera Jeevan" (Slow Version) - Kishore Kumar
"Yeh Mera Jeevan" (female) - Alka Yagnik

References

External links

Indian romantic drama films
1985 films
Hindi remakes of Malayalam films
1980s Hindi-language films
1985 romantic drama films
Films directed by A. C. Tirulokchandar
Films scored by Rajesh Roshan